Massey Bromley  was the English Chief Mechanical Engineer of the Great Eastern Railway in 1878–81. During that brief period he established the Stratford Works in East London as the place where most of the Great Eastern's locomotives were built. Bromley was killed in the Penistone rail crash of 1884.

Sources
LNER Encyclopedia (see below)

External links
Massey Bromley – LNER Encyclopedia
Massey Bromley – steamindex.com

1846 births
1884 deaths
Locomotive builders and designers
English railway mechanical engineers
Railway accident deaths in England
Great Eastern Railway people
People from Wolverhampton
Engineers from the West Midlands (county)